Martin Pahlmblad (born May 9, 1986) is a Swedish professional basketball player for the Swedish team Södertälje BBK of the Basketligan.

Professional career
During his professional career, Pahlmblad has played with Solna Vikings, LF Basket,  Södertälje Kings and PVSK Panthers. 

On August 3, 2015, he signed with Apollon Patras of the Greek Basketball League. After one year, he left the club and joined the newly promoted in the Greek Basket League Kymis.

On July 27, 2017, Pahlmblad returned to Södertälje Kings of the Basketligan after 3 years.

National team career
Pahlmblad has also played for the Swedish Basketball National Team Program. He was in the default squad for the EuroBasket 2017 qualification.

References

External links
Eurobasket.com profile
Basketball-Reference.com profile 
Scoresway profile
RealGM profile
FIBA profile

1986 births
Living people
Apollon Patras B.C. players
Kymis B.C. players
PVSK Panthers players
Shooting guards
Södertälje Kings players
Swedish men's basketball players
Sportspeople from Lund